Clive Brown (born 1946) is an Australian state politician.

Clive Brown may also refer to:

Clive Brown (golfer) in 1997 Walker Cup
Clive Brown (footballer) (1934–2009), Australian footballer for Geelong
Clive Brown (motorcycle racer), British motorcycle racer, in 1971 Grand Prix motorcycle racing season
Clive Brown (musician), bassist in Ras Nas